The Jacksonville Dixie Blues are a women's American football team based in Jacksonville, Florida. Founded in 2001, they are currently members of the Women's Football Alliance (WFA), playing their home games on the campus of University Christian School.

History
The Dixie Blues were a former member of the now disbanded Women's American Football League, where they were runners-up in the first championship game in 2001 and won the title in 2002. After the league disbanded, they joined the Women's Football Association; they won the league championship in 2003. The league folded after that single season and the team spent the next two seasons in the Independent Women's Football League. The Dixie Blues then moved to the Women's Football League, where they won the 2006 and 2007 titles.

They were planning to join the National Women's Football Association in 2009, but have instead become one of the charter franchises in the Women's Football Alliance.  So far, the Dixie Blues' WFA tenure has been extremely successful, winning three straight division titles. Until 2013, the Dixie Blues were the only WFA charter member never to have lost a regular-season game in league play. As of the end of the 2017 regular season, their current record stands at 136–24. The Dixie Blues begin their 18th season in April 2018.

Season-by-season 

|-
| colspan="6" align="center" | Jacksonville Dixie Blues (WAFL)
|-
|2001 || 5 || 5 || 0 || 3rd South Atlantic || Won Atlantic Conference Semifinal (Indianapolis)Won Atlantic Conference Championship (Tampa Bay)Lost WAFL Championship (California)
|-
| colspan="6" align="center" | Jacksonville Dixie Blues (WFA (2002))
|-
|2002 || 9 || 1 || 0  || -- || Won Southern Conference Final (Orlando Fire)Won WFA Championship (Indianapolis)
|-
| colspan="6" align="center" | Jacksonville Dixie Blues (IWFL)
|-
|2004 || 5 || 1 || 0 || X-Team || --
|-
|2005 || 8 || 2 || 0 || 1st East South Atlantic || Lost Eastern Conference Semifinal (Atlanta)
|-
| colspan="6" align="center" | Jacksonville Dixie Blues (WFL)
|-
|2006 || 10 || 0 || 0 || 1st League || Won WFL Semifinal (Mississippi)Won WFL Championship (Tennessee)
|-
|2007 || 6 || 0 || 0 || 1st League || Won WFL Championship (Clarksville)
|-
|2008 || colspan="6" rowspan="1" align="center" | Did Not Play 
|-
| colspan="6" align="center" | Jacksonville Dixie Blues (WFA)
|-
|2009 || 8 || 0 || 0 || 1st American Southeast || Won American Conference Semifinal (Austin)Lost American Conference Championship (St. Louis)
|-
|2010 || 8 || 0 || 0 || 1st National South Central || Won National Conference Quarterfinal (Central Florida)Lost National Conference Semifinal (St. Louis)
|-
|2011 || 8 || 0 || 0 || 1st National South Atlantic || Won National Conference Quarterfinal (Miami)Lost National Conference Semifinal (Indy)
|-
|2012 || 8 || 0 || 0 || 1st WFA National 9 || Won National Conference Quarterfinal (Atlanta)Lost National Conference Semifinal (Chicago)
|-
!Totals || 86 || 15 || 0
|colspan="2"| (including playoffs)

* = current standing

2009

Season schedule

** = Won by forfeit

2010

Season schedule

2011

Standings

Season schedule

2012

Season schedule

References

External links 
Official Website

Women's Football Alliance teams
American football teams in Florida
Dixie Blues
American football teams established in 2001
2001 establishments in Florida
Women's sports in Florida